Akin Gazi (born 15 October 1981) is a British actor.

Life and career
Gazi was born in North London, in 1981, to Turkish Cypriot parents. He attended Queen Mary, University of London studying English and Drama graduating in 2003.

He is married to economist and activist Faiza Shaheen.

Filmography

Film

Television

References

External links 
 

1981 births
21st-century English male actors
British people of Turkish Cypriot descent
English male film actors
English male television actors
English people of Turkish Cypriot descent
Living people
Male actors from London
People from Edmonton, London